Annie Laurie is a 1916 British silent romance film directed by Cecil Hepworth and starring Alma Taylor, Stewart Rome and Lionelle Howard. It is loosely based on the poem Annie Laurie.

Cast
 Alma Taylor ...  Annie Laurie 
 Stewart Rome ...  Sir John McDougal 
 Lionelle Howard ...  Alfred English 
 Gwynne Herbert ...  Hannah Black 
 Henry Vibart ...  The Doctor

References

External links

1916 films
1910s historical romance films
British silent short films
1910s English-language films
Films directed by Cecil Hepworth
Films set in Scotland
British silent feature films
British black-and-white films
Hepworth Pictures films
British historical romance films
1910s British films
Silent historical romance films